Ion Țîrcovnicu (7 April 1936 – 10 March 2003) was a Romanian football forward.

International career
Ion Țîrcovnicu played one game for Romania's national team in a friendly against Turkey which ended 0–0. He also played two games for Romania's Olympic team, one of them was a 2–1 victory in a friendly against Yugoslavia in which he scored Romania's first goal, the other one being a 2–3 loss against Denmark at the 1964 Summer Olympics qualifiers.

Honours
Dinamo București
Divizia A: 1961–62, 1962–63, 1963–64, 1964–65
Cupa României: 1963–64
Dinamo Pitești
Cupa României runner-up: 1964–65

Notes

References

External links

Ion Țîrcovnicu at Labtof.ro

1936 births
2003 deaths
Romanian footballers
Romania international footballers
Association football forwards
Liga I players
Liga II players
FC Progresul București players
Victoria București players
Unirea Tricolor București players
FC Dinamo București players
FCM Bacău players
FC Argeș Pitești players
Footballers from Bucharest